The New Jersey Division of Consumer Affairs (DCA) is a governmental agency in the U.S. state of New Jersey that is responsible for protecting the public "from fraud, deceit and misrepresentation in the sale of goods and services." The DCA operates within the New Jersey Department of Law and Public Safety in the office of the New Jersey Attorney General.

Sections and units within the Division of Consumer Affairs include:
Alternative Dispute Resolution - resolves disputes outside of the court system
Bureau of Securities - regulates the securities industry in New Jersey
Regulated Businesses and Professions - supervises 41 boards and committees, regulating more than 80 separate professions and occupations, including cosmetologists, plumbers and veterinarians
Office of Consumer Protection - investigates consumer fraud complaints
Legalized Games of Chance Control Commission - oversees the operation of bingo and raffle games
Office of Weights and Measures - verifies the accuracy of commercial weighing and measuring devices

Notable Directors
Millicent Fenwick
James J. Barry Jr

References

External links
New Jersey Division of Consumer Affairs

Consumer
Organizations based in Newark, New Jersey